Music Is Forever is an extended play by various artists, released on December 17, 2021, by Gallo Records. It features Sun-El Musician, Nobuhle, Da Capo, Muzi and others.

Background and recording 
On December 15, 2021, Gallo Records announced the  extended play titled Music Is Forever.

Production was handled  by Black Coffee  as executive producer.

Release 

"Too Late for Mama" was released by Mpho Sebina on October 4, 2021.

Track listing

Release history

References 

2021 EPs